Ryabovsky is a rural locality (a khutor) and the administrative center of Ryabovskoye Rural Settlement, Alexeyevsky District, Volgograd Oblast, Russia. The population was 871 as of 2010.

Geography 
Ryabovsky is located 54 km southwest from Alexeyevskaya (the district's administrative centre) by road. Stanovsky is the nearest rural locality.

References 

Rural localities in Alexeyevsky District, Volgograd Oblast